Angélique Abemane is a female Congolese handball player. She competed in the 1980 Summer Olympics.

References

Living people
Year of birth missing (living people)
Handball players at the 1980 Summer Olympics
Olympic handball players of the Republic of the Congo
Republic of the Congo female handball players